Heinz Weiss (12 June 192120 November 2010) was a German film actor.

Weiss is best known for playing the role of Phil Decker in the Jerry Cotton series of films and the role of Captain Heinz Hansen in Das Traumschiff. He also played the character "Kramer" in the iconic World War II film The Great Escape (1963). He himself had served in German military, the Wehrmacht, during World War II.

He died on 20 November 2010 in Grünwald near Munich.

Filmography

Film

Television

References

External links
 

1921 births
2010 deaths
German male film actors
German male television actors
20th-century German male actors
Male actors from Stuttgart